The Molise regional election of 2011 took place on 16–17 October 2011.

Michele Iorio (PdL) narrowly defeated Paolo Di Laura Frattura (PD) and secured a third consecutive term as President of Molise.

In May 2012 a tribunal declared the election invalid due to irregularities committed by Iorio and his centre-right coalition. Finally, the Italian Council of State confirmed this election as invalid on 29 October 2012 and the new elections were held in February 2013.

Results
Sources: Ministry of the Interior – Historical Archive of Elections

See also
 List of annulled elections

References

2011 elections in Italy
2011 regional election
Annulled elections
2011
October 2011 events in Italy